Pheidole malinsii is a species of ant in the subfamily Myrmicinae. It is found in India, Sri Lanka, and China.

References

External links

 at antwiki.org
Animaldiversity.org
Itis.org

malinsii
Hymenoptera of Asia
Insects described in 1902